The statue of St. Proclus (1494–1495) was created by Michelangelo out of marble.  Its height is 58.5 cm.  It is situated in the Basilica of San Domenico, Bologna.  Its subject is Saint Proculus (Proculus), a martyr of Bologna.

See also
List of works by Michelangelo

External links

Sculptures by Michelangelo
1490s sculptures
Marble sculptures in Italy